The list of ship commissionings in 1900 includes a chronological list of all ships commissioned in 1900.



See also 

1900